Jamila Abbas, is a computer scientist, software engineer, businesswoman and entrepreneur in Kenya. She is the co-founder and chief executive officer of MFarm Kenya Limited, an internet-based organisation that helps farmers find the best farm implements, seeds, access to weather reports and market information. She co-founded M-Farm in 2010.

Background and education
Jamila was born in Kenya and attended local schools for her pre-university education. She attended Strathmore University, graduating with a Bachelor of Science degree in Software engineering.

Career
Following her graduation from Strathmore University, Jamila was hired by Kenya Medical Research Institute (KEMRI). She also became member at iHub, a technology community, where techies gather to exchange ideas. There, she was reconnected with Susan Oguya, a friend from university. In September 2010, Jamila and Susan decided to actively do something about the plight of Kenyan small-scale farmers, using technology.

The two women, also  joined AkiraChix, another forum for women with interest in information technology. There, they met three other Strathmore University students, Linda Omwenga, Lillian Nduati, and Catherine Kiguru. The five of them decided to enter IPO48, a software development competition. The event, involved 100 contestants, organised in seventeen teams. The objective was to develop a computer application, which can be turned into a marketable business, all within 48 hours.

The competition was organized by HumanIPO, from Estonia. In November 2011, the five women won the competition, with their M-Farm application, that connects farmers with agro-suppliers, cooperatives and enables them to access current market prices for their produce in a timely manner. The five ladies also won the top prize of KSh1 million (approx. US$10,000).

The group used their prize money to incorporate M-Farm Kenya Limited, with Jamila Abbas as CEO, Susan Oguya as COO. Linda Omwenga and Catherine Kiguru were marketing officers and Lillian Nduati was the public relations officers.

Other considerations
Abbas concurrently serves as the country director of  New Vision Foundation, a Minneapolis-based non-profit organization.

See also
Susan Oguya
Agriculture in Kenya
Economy of Kenya

References

External links
Website of M-Farm Kenya Limited 
Startup: MFarm  Connecting Farmers

Living people
1984 births
21st-century Kenyan businesswomen
21st-century Kenyan businesspeople
Kenyan software engineers
Kenyan chief executives
Strathmore University alumni
Kenyan women business executives
People from Wajir County
Kenyan women computer scientists